The Montpellier Zoological Park (formally Parc Zoologique de Lunaret) is a French zoological park located in the region Occitanie, in the north of the city of Montpellier.

The greenhouse opened in 2007 as part of the Montpellier Zoo with a footprint of about 2,600 m2. It represents 7 climatic zones and habitats, with a large aviary, and with an artificial rainstorm every two hours to simulate the rainforest environment.

The greenhouse now contains more than 500 animals and 8,000 plants representing 300 species. Its animal collection includes anacondas, ants, anteaters, armadillos, bats, boas, caymans, ibises, ocelots, piranhas, tamarins, and tarantulas. The plant collections include 34 species of palm trees, 15 species of tree ferns, and 95 types of trees, with plants of interest including Acrosticum aureum, Anthurium ferrierense, Canna indica, Cattleya bicolor, Cattleya mossiae, Cephaelis poeppigiana, Costus cuspidatus, Heliconia angusta, Hibiscus elatus, Philodendron elegans, Philodendron panduriforme, Polypodium polypodioides, Tillandsia cyanea, Vriesea carinata, and Xanthosoma violaceum.

See also 
 List of botanical gardens in France

References 
 Zoo Montpellier description
 Office de Tourisme de Montpellier entry (French)
 "La Serre Amazonienne du Parc Zoologique de Montpellier ouvre ses portes", Tela Botanica announcement (in French)

Amazonienne, Serre
Amazonienne, Serre
Tourist attractions in Montpellier
Greenhouses in France
Zoos in France
Zoos established in 1964
Organizations based in Montpellier